The Fleet's In is a 1928 American silent comedy film directed by Malcolm St. Clair and written by Monte Brice, George Marion Jr., and J. Walter Ruben. The film stars Clara Bow, James Hall, Jack Oakie, Bodil Rosing, Eddie Dunn, and Jean Laverty. The film was released on September 15, 1928, by Paramount Pictures.

Cast 
Clara Bow as Trixie Deane
James Hall as Eddie Briggs
Jack Oakie as Searchlight Doyle
Bodil Rosing as Mrs. Deane
Eddie Dunn as Al Pearce
Jean Laverty as Betty
Dan Wolheim as Double Duty Duffy
Richard Carle as Judge Hartley
Joseph W. Girard as Commandant

Survival status
The Fleet's In is presumed to be a lost film.

References

External links 

 

1928 films
1920s English-language films
Silent American comedy films
1928 comedy films
Paramount Pictures films
Films about the United States Navy
Films directed by Malcolm St. Clair
American black-and-white films
Lost American films
American silent feature films
1928 lost films
Lost comedy films
1920s American films
Silent adventure films